Agnieszka Brandebura (born 16 April 1981 in Łódź) is a Polish rhythmic gymnast.

Brandebura competed for Poland in the rhythmic gymnastics individual all-around competition at the 2000 Summer Olympics in Sydney. There she was 13th in the qualification round and didn't advance to the final of 10 competitors.

References

External links 
 
 
 
 

1979 births
Living people
Polish rhythmic gymnasts
Gymnasts at the 2000 Summer Olympics
Olympic gymnasts of Poland
Sportspeople from Łódź